Youssoupha Mabiki (born August 29, 1979), better known by his nickname Youssoupha is a French rapper of Congolese descent.

Early life and career
He was born to a Congolese father, the musician and Congo-Kinshasa political figure Tabu Ley Rochereau and a Senegalese mother. After spending his childhood in Congo-Kinshasa, at the age of 10, he moved to France to live with relatives in Beziers, then Osny, Cergy and Sartrouville. He finished his French baccaleureat at Académie de Versailles with high grades and continued with Cultural Mediation, Communication at Roanne and La Guillotière. After obtaining his master's degree, he dedicated himself to music.

His first album Frères Lumières was a trio with two other friends. They released a maxi single. He was also involved in many musical projects including the album Tendance by the band Bana Kin (with Sinistre Kozi Philo and Mic genie).

His own street DVD was released at end of 2005 as Eternel Recommencement followed in 2006 and was signed to Hostile record label. After working with a number of renowned rappers, he released his debut studio album in March 2007 titled À chaque frère ("To Every Brother") containing collaborations from Diam's, Kool Shen, S'Pi and Mike Génie.

His second album came out in October 2009 called Sur les chemins du retour ("On the Ways of Return"), alongside an international tour. In preparation of his third album, he also released a downloadable  
Digi-tape En noir et blanc - En attendant Noir Désir ("Black & White, Waiting for Black Desire") where he included some remixes of the album. In January 2012, he released his third studio album Noir désir ("Black Desire") featuring Taipan, Corneille, S-Pi, Sam's, Indila, LFDV and his own father Tabu Ley Rochereau"

In popular culture
He took part as songwriting teacher at the French reality television program Popstars.
In 2009, French journalist Éric Zemmour opened a lawsuit against him accusing him of public threats for diabolizing the banlieues. Youssoupha responded in an interview with Le Parisien that he advocated non-violence, but was pointing out the contradictions of Zemmour. He also responded with his single Menace de mort (meaning Death threat in English) with clips from various television programs quoting anti-immigrant sentiments expressed by media figures.
His song La Foule featured in the second episode of the first season of the Amazon streaming series The Boys.

Accolades
 MTV Africa Music Awards 2014 - Best Francophone (Nominated)

Decorations 
 Chevalier of the Order of Arts and Letters (2016)

Discography

Albums

Singles

As featured artist

Other charting songs

See also
French hip hop

References

External links
Official website
 
 

French rappers
French people of Democratic Republic of the Congo descent
1979 births
Living people
People from Kinshasa
French people of Senegalese descent
Chevaliers of the Ordre des Arts et des Lettres
People from Sartrouville